Kojo Botsio (21 February 1916 – 6 February 2001) was a Ghanaian diplomat and politician. He studied in Britain, where he became the treasurer of the West African National Secretariat and an acting warden for the West African Students' Union. He served as his country's first Minister of Education and Social Welfare from 1951, as Minister for Foreign Affairs twice in the government of Kwame Nkrumah, and was a leading figure in the ruling Convention People's Party (CPP).

Early life and education
Kojo Botsio attended Adisadel College, Cape Coast and then the Achimota College in Accra. He proceeded to Sierra Leone, where he obtained his first degree from the Fourah Bay University College, the only university in West Africa at the time. He then went to the United Kingdom in 1945 and attended Brasenose College, Oxford University, where he was awarded a postgraduate degree in Geography and Education.

Career
Botsio was a teacher at the St. Augustine's College and the London City Council Secondary School in the United Kingdom. He was also once Vice-Principal of Abuakwa State College at Kibi in Ghana. Some of his students have been Kofi Baako and P. K. K. Quaidoo who were both ministers in Nkrumah's government.

Politics
Botsio first met Nkrumah in 1945 while in London. He helped form the CPP. He first entered the Legislative Assembly of Ghana when he won the Winneba seat at the 1951 Gold Coast legislative election and served under Kwame Nkrumah who was the leader of government business. He continued to be in the legislative assembly until 1957, when he became a Member of parliament (MP). He remained an MP until 1966 when the Parliament of Ghana was suspended by the National Liberation Council which had overthrown the CPP government of Kwame Nkrumah. He was with Nkrumah when he died in 1972. He initially served as the Minister for Trade and Industry in the CPP government. He was also at various times, minister for Foreign Affairs, Social Welfare, Transport and Communications, Agriculture, Trade and Development.

Family
Kojo Botsio was married to Ruth Whittaker. They had two children, Kojo and Merene, both barristers.

References

1916 births
2001 deaths
Ghanaian MPs 1951–1954
Ghanaian MPs 1954–1956
Ghanaian MPs 1956–1965
Ghanaian MPs 1965–1966
Alumni of Achimota School
Alumni of Brasenose College, Oxford
Fourah Bay College alumni
Foreign ministers of Ghana
Labour ministers of Ghana
Agriculture ministers of Ghana
Trade ministers of Ghana
Convention People's Party (Ghana) politicians
Ghanaian independence activists
Alumni of Adisadel College